Rathausmann is a monument on the top of the city hall in Rathaus, Vienna, Austria. Rathausmann is one of the symbols of Vienna. The statue itself is 5.4 meters tall (including flagpole), and its armor was modeled after that of Emperor Maximilian I.

A replica of the statue is in Rathauspark.

See also 
 Vienna City Hall

References

External links 

Buildings and structures in Innere Stadt
Monuments and memorials in Austria